Haiphong Road is a road south of Kowloon Park, Tsim Sha Tsui, Hong Kong. The road links Canton Road and Nathan Road.

History
It was initially named as Elgin Street but its name changed in 1909 to Haiphong, a city in Vietnam to avoid confusion with another Elgin Street on the Hong Kong Island. As such, it is one of the few streets in Hong Kong not named for a Chinese or English subject. Along with Nathan Road it was one of the first two streets laid out in Tsim Sha Tsui. Indian merchants, mostly Hindus from the province of Sindh, began establishing shops on the street in the 1920s, supplying Indian goods to soldiers stationed in the adjacent Whitfield Barracks.

Features
Significant locations along this street include the Fok Tak Temple, a century-old temple site that was "once the centre for worship for Kowloon residents"; the Kowloon Masjid and Islamic Centre; and the Haiphong Road Temporary Market, thought to be the oldest such market in Hong Kong.

See also
 List of streets and roads in Hong Kong

References

External links

Google Maps of Haiphong Road

Tsim Sha Tsui
Roads in Kowloon